Jodi Thomas (born Amarillo, Texas) is the pen name of Jodi Koumalats, an American author of historical romance novels, most of which are set in Texas. In 2006, she was inducted into the Romance Writers of America Hall of Fame.

Biography
Jodi Thomas is a fifth-generation Texan, whose grandmother was born in Texas in a covered wagon.   She grew up in Amarillo, Texas and moved to Lubbock to attend Texas Tech University.  She has a master's degree in Family Studies.

Thomas married Tom Koumalats and spent several years travelling while he served in the United States Army.  The couple then returned to Amarillo and had two sons.  Both husband and wife became teachers, and for the next fifteen years Thomas taught family living at Amarillo High School.

In 1984, worried that teacher salaries would be insufficient to save for her children's college education, Thomas began writing.  Her first published work was an article for the Oklahoma Daily about the Llano Cemetery in Amarillo.  She also sold many short stories for children, most averaging about 244 words.  By 1988, Thomas had begun writing in earnest after work.  When she sold her first book, publishers suggested that her surname, Koumalats, was too ethnic.  As a compromise, she took her husband's first name as her pen name.

Thomas's first novel, Beneath the Texas Sky, met with critical success. It won a Romantic Times Reviewer's Choice Award for Best Western Romance and was designated a National Press Women Novel of the Year.  By 1991, Thomas was able to quit teaching to become a full-time writer.  She has won three Romance Writers of America RITA Awards,–the highest award given to romance novelists– in 1992, 1995, and 2006.  Her third win, for The Texan's Reward, led to her immediate induction into the Romance Writers of America Hall of Fame.  Thomas has been nominated for RITAs several other times. Her novels have been translated into at least six languages.  Several of her novels have appeared on the New York Times Bestseller List or the USAToday Bestseller List.

In 2003, Thomas became the writer-in-residence at West Texas A&M University.  She was only the second writer-in-residence to be appointed.

Books
Thomas began writing historical romances in the early 1980s because she was dissatisfied with the ones she had read.  In many cases, the romances she picked up contained historical errors or relationships that she thought were implausible.  Her own novels draw on family stories of living in Texas, as well as months of research for each. The majority of her novels are set in Texas, and many contain the word "Texas" or "Texan" in the title.

Although most of her novels are historical or contemporary romances, with Widows of Wichita County Thomas branched into mainstream women's fiction.

Awards
1988 - National Press Women's Novel of the Year, Beneath the Texas Sky
1990 - (Texas) Panhandle Professional Writers Best Novel, Northern Star
1990 - Oklahoma Writers Federation, Inc. best novel, Northern Star
1991 - Romance Writers of America (RWA) RITA Award for Best Historical Romance, The Tender Texan
1994 - Romance Writers of America RITA Award for Best Historical Romance, To Tame a Texan's Heart
1998 - Romantic Time Magazine Career Achievement Award for outstanding contributions to women's fiction over the past ten years
1999 - Romantic Times Magazine Career Achievement Award for Outstanding Fiction
2002 - Named a Texas Tech University Distinguished Alumna
2005 - National Reader's Choice Award, Finding Mary Blaine
2006 - Romance Writers of America (RWA) RITA Award,The Texan's Reward
2006 - Inducted into the Romance Writers of America Hall of Fame

Bibliography

The Wife Lottery Series
The Texan's Wager, 2002
When a Texan Gambles, 2003
A Texan's Luck, 2004
The Texan's Reward, 2005

The McLain Series
The Texan's Touch, 1998
To Kiss a Texan, 1999
To Wed in Texas, 2000
Twilight in Texas, 2001
The Texan's Dream, 2001

The Whispering Mountain Series
Texas Rain, 2006
Texas Princess, 2007
Tall, Dark, and Texan, 2008
The Lone Texan, 2009
Texas Blue, 2011
Wild Texas Rose, 2012
Promise Me Texas, 2013

The Harmony Series 
Welcome to Harmony, 2010 - Book 1 - Harmony Series
Somewhere Along the Way,  2010 - Book 2 - Harmony Series
The Comforts of Home, 2011 - Book 3 - Harmony Series
Just Down the Road, 2012 - Book 4 - Harmony Series
Chance of a Lifetime, 2013 - Book 5 - Harmony Series
Can't Stop Believing, 2013 - Book 6 - Harmony Series
Betting the Rainbow, 2014 - Book 7 - Harmony Series
A Place Called Harmony (Series Prequel), 2014 - Book 8 - Harmony Series
One True Heart, April 7, 2015 - Book 9 - Harmony Series

The Ransom Canyon Series 
Winter's Camp, 2015
Ransom Canyon, 2015
Rustler's Moon, 2016
Lone Heart Pass, 2016
Sunrise Crossing, August 2016
Wild Horse Springs, January 2017
Indigo Lake, July 2017

The Historical Series
Beneath the Texas Sky, 1988
Northern Star, 1990
The Tender Texan, 1991
Prairie Song, 1992
Cherish the Dream, 1993
The Texan and the Lady, 1994
To Tame a Texan's Heart, 1994
Forever in Texas, 1995
Texas Love Song, 1996
Two Texas Hearts, 1997

The Contemporary Series
The Widows of Wichita County, 2003
Finding Mary Blaine, 2004
The Secrets of Rosa Lee, 2005
Twisted Creek, 2008
Rewriting Monday, 2009

Anthologies
Sweet Hearts, 1993
A Country Christmas, 1993
How to Lasso a Cowboy, 2004
Give Me a Texan, 2008
Give Me a Cowboy, 2009
Give Me a Texas Ranger, 2010
Give Me a Texas Outlaw, 2011
A Texas Christmas, 2011
Be My Texas Valentine, 2012
One Texas Night, 2013
Boots Under Her Bed, 2014

References

External links
Jodi Thomas Official Website

20th-century American novelists
21st-century American novelists
American romantic fiction writers
People from Amarillo, Texas
RITA Award winners
Texas Tech University alumni
Novelists from Texas
Living people
Year of birth missing (living people)
American women novelists
Women romantic fiction writers
20th-century American women writers
21st-century American women writers